Slavik Alkhasov (born on 6 February 1993) is an Azerbaijani footballer who plays as a defender for Sabah in the Azerbaijan Premier League.

Club career
Alkhasov made his debut in the Azerbaijan Premier League for Sumgayit on 6 August 2011, match against Khazar Lankaran.

On 25 June 2020, Alkhasov signed a 2+1 years contract with Sabah FC.

Honours
Keşla
Azerbaijan Cup (1): 2017–18

References

External links
 

1993 births
Living people
Association football defenders
Azerbaijani footballers
Azerbaijan youth international footballers
Azerbaijan under-21 international footballers
Azerbaijan Premier League players
Neftçi PFK players
Sumgayit FK players
Khazar Lankaran FK players
Shamakhi FK players
Sabah FC (Azerbaijan) players